The Poeciliidae are a family of freshwater fishes of the order Cyprinodontiformes, the tooth-carps, and include well-known live-bearing aquarium fish, such as the guppy, molly, platy, and swordtail. The original distribution of the family was the Southeastern United States to north of Río de la Plata, Argentina, and Africa, including Madagascar. Due to release of aquarium specimens and the widespread use of species of the genera Poecilia and Gambusia for mosquito control, though,  poeciliids can today be found in all tropical and subtropical areas of the world. In addition,  Poecilia and Gambusia specimens have been identified in hot springs pools as far north as Banff, Alberta.

Live-bearing 
Although the whole family Poeciliidae is known as "live bearers" (viviparous), some species are egg-scattering with external fertilization.  All African species are egg-layers, and (with the exception of the members of the genus Tomeurus), all American species are live-bearers. Among the three subfamilies, the Aplocheilichthyinae are restricted to Africa, the Poeciliinae are primarily from the Americas (the only exception is the African Rhexipanchax), and the Procatopodinae are mainly from Africa (the South American Fluviphylax and Pseudopoecilia are the only exceptions). This distribution suggests that the Poeciliidae antedate the split between Africa and South America 100 million years ago, and that live-bearing subsequently evolved in South America. Poeciliids colonized North America through the Antilles, while they were connected 44 million years ago. Poeciliids then moved to Central America by the Aves land bridge on the Caribbean Plate. When South America connected to Central America three million years ago, some further dispersal southward occurred, but South American species did not move into Central America.

Among the live-bearing species, differences are seen in the mode and degree of support the female gives the developing larvae. Many members of the family Poeciliidae are considered to be lecithotrophic (the mother provisions the oocyte with all the resources it needs prior to fertilization, so the egg is independent of the mother), but others are matrotrophic (literally "mother feeding": the mother provides the majority of resources to the developing offspring after fertilization). Lecithotrophy and matrotrophy are not discrete traits. Most scientific studies quantify matrotrophy using a matrotrophy index (MI), which is the dry mass of fully developed offspring divided by the dry mass of a fertilized egg.

Members of the genus Poeciliopsis, for example, show variable reproductive life history adaptations. Poeciliopsis monacha, P. lucida, and P. prolifica form part of the same clade within that genus. However, their modes of maternal provisioning vary greatly. P. monacha can be considered to be lecithotrophic because it does not really provide any resources for its offspring after fertilization - the pregnant female is basically a swimming egg sac. P. lucida shows an intermediate level of matrotrophy, meaning that to a certain extent the offspring's metabolism can actually affect the mother's metabolism, allowing for increased nutrient exchange. P. prolifica is considered to be highly matrotrophic, and almost all of the nutrients and materials needed for fetal development are supplied to the oocyte after it has been fertilized. This level of matrotrophy allows Poeciliopsis to carry several broods at different stages of development, a phenomenon known as superfetation. Because the space for developing embryos is limited, viviparity reduces brood size. Superfetation can compensate for this loss by keeping embryos at various stages and sizes during development.

P. elongata, P. turneri, and P. presidionis form another clade that could be considered an outgroup to the P. monacha, P.lucida, and P. prolifica clade. These three species are very highly matrotrophic - so much so that in 1947, C. L. Turner described the follicular cells of P. turneri as "pseudo-placenta, pseudo-chorion, and pseudo-allantois". The greater degree of matrotrophy in a species is linked with a higher degree of placentation, including "a thicker maternal follicle, higher degree of vascularization, and greater number of villi in the placenta".

The reason for placental evolution in Poeciliids is controversial, and involves two major groups of hypotheses, adaptive and conflict hypotheses. Adaptive hypotheses, including the locomotor hypothesis, Trexler-DeAngelis Model (reproductive allotment), and life-history facilitation, broadly suggest that the placenta evolved to facilitate the evolution of another advantageous trait in the fish’s environment. The conflict hypothesis suggests the placenta is a nonadaptive byproduct of genetic "tug-o-war" between the mother and the offspring for resources.

Subfamilies and tribes
The family is divided into subfamilies and tribes as follows:

 Subfamily Aplocheilichythinae Myers, 1928 (Banded lampeyes)
Genus Aplocheilichthys Bleeker, 1863
Genus Hylopanchax  Poll & J. G. Lambert,1958
 Subfamily Procatopodinae Fowler, 1916 (Lampeyes)
 Tribe Fluviphylacini Roberts, 1970
 Genus Fluviphylax Whitley, 1920
 Tribe Procatopodini Fowler, 1916
 Genus Laciris Huber, 1981
 Genus Micropanchax Myers, 1924
 Genus Lacustricola Myers, 1924 
 Genus Poropanchax Clausen, 1967
 Genus Platypanchax Ahl, 1928
 Genus Lamprichthys Regan 1911
 Genus Pantanodon Myers, 1955
 Genus Hypsopanchax Myers, 1924
 Genus Procatopus Boulenger, 1904
 Genus Plataplochilus Ahl, 1928
 Genus Rhexipanchax Huber, 1999
 Subfamily Poeciliinae Bonaparte, 1831 (Livebearers)
 Tribe Alfarini Hubbs, 1924
Genus Alfaro Meek, 1912
 Tribe Gambusini Gill, 1889
Genus Belonesox Kner, 1860
Genus Brachyrhaphis Regan, 1913
Genus Gambusia Poey, 1854
Genus Heterophallus Regan, 1914
 Tribe Heterandriini Hubbs, 1924
Genus Heterandria Agassiz, 1853
Genus Neoheterandria Henn 1916
Genus Poeciliopsis Regan 1913
Genus Priapichthys Regan 1913
Genus Pseudopoecilia Regan 1913
Genus Xenophallus Hubbs, 1924 
 Tribe Poeciliini Bonaparte, 1831 
 Genus Limia Poey, 1854
 Genus Micropoecilia Hubbs, 1926
 Genus Pamphorichthys Regan, 1913
 Genus Phallichthys Hubbs, 1924
 Genus Poecilia Bloch & Schneider, 1801
 Genus Xiphophorus Heckel, 1848
 Tribe Cnesterodontini Hubbs, 1924
 Genus Cnesterodon Garman, 1895
 Genus Phalloceros Eigenmann, 1907
 Genus Phalloptychus Eigenmann, 1907
 Genus Phallotorynus Henn, 1916
 Genus Tomeurus Eigenmann, 1909
 Tribe Scolichthyini Rosen, 1967
 Genus Scolichthys Rosen, 1967
 Tribe Xenodexini Hubbs, 1950
Genus Xenodexia Hubbs, 1950

References 
 
 

 
Ray-finned fish families
Fishkeeping
Freshwater fish of Africa
Freshwater fish of Central America
Freshwater fish of South America
Freshwater fish of Mexico
Freshwater fish of the United States
Live-bearing fish
Ovoviviparous fish
Viviparous fish

Cyprinodontiformes
Taxa named by Charles Lucien Bonaparte